The 30th World Science Fiction Convention (Worldcon), also known as L.A.con I, was held on 1–4 September 1972 at the International Hotel in Los Angeles, California, United States.

The organising committee was co-chaired by Charles Crayne and Bruce Pelz.

Participants 

Attendance was approximately 2,007.

Guests of Honor 

 Frederik Pohl (pro)
 Buck Coulson and Juanita Coulson (fan)
 Robert Bloch (toastmaster)

Awards

1972 Hugo Awards 

 Best Novel: To Your Scattered Bodies Go by Philip José Farmer
 Best Novella: The Queen of Air and Darkness by Poul Anderson
 Best Short Story: "Inconstant Moon" by Larry Niven
 Best Dramatic Presentation: A Clockwork Orange
 Best Professional Artist: Frank Kelly Freas
 Best Professional Magazine: Fantasy & Science Fiction
 Best Amateur Magazine: Locus (editors: Charles and Dena Brown)

Other awards 

 Special Award: Harlan Ellison for excellence in anthologizing
 Special Award: Club du Livre d'Anticipation (France) for excellence in book production
 Special Award: Nueva Dimension (Spain) for excellence in magazine production

Future site selection 

The 33rd World Science Fiction Convention was awarded to Aussiecon I in Melbourne, Australia. This was the first time a Worldcon was awarded to a site outside North America or Europe.

Notes 

At the L.A.Con I masquerade, one of the contestants, artist Scott Shaw!, came on stage wearing only a bathing suit, with his body completely covered with crunchy peanut butter. The name of his costume was "The Turd." from an underground comic story Shaw wrote and illustrated. Since some of the peanut butter tended to drip off of him, making the floor sticky for other contestants, a rule was passed that forever after at science fiction convention masquerades, no peanut butter costumes would be allowed. This masquerade rule is universally known among science fiction fans as the "no peanut butter rule."

The first video game competition at a science fiction convention was held, and a science fiction fan named Kevan Pritchard from Lawndale, California, won the world championship contest in the game Spacewar!.

See also 

 Hugo Award
 Science fiction
 Speculative fiction
 World Science Fiction Society
 Worldcon

References 

1972 conferences
1972 in California
1972 in the United States
Culture of Los Angeles
Science fiction conventions in the United States
Worldcon